The Dillards are an American bluegrass and country rock band from Salem, Missouri. The band is best known for introducing bluegrass music into the popular mainstream with their appearance as "The Darlings" on The Andy Griffith Show.

Band members

The Dillards originally consisted of:

 Douglas Dillard (born March 6, 1937, Salem, Missouri – May 16, 2012) – banjo
 Rodney Dillard (born May 18, 1942, Salem, Missouri) – guitar, dobro
 Dean Webb (born Roy Dean Webb, March 28, 1937, Independence, Missouri – June 30, 2018) – mandolin
 Mitchell Franklin "Mitch" Jayne (born July 5, 1928, Hammond, Indiana – August 2, 2010) – double bass

In 1968, Doug Dillard left to form Dillard and Clark. He continued to play occasionally with his brother until a few years before his death, in 2012.

The 2015 lineup included:

 Rodney Dillard and his wife Beverly Cotten-Dillard – clawhammer banjo, vocals
 Tony Wray, featured guest – guitar, banjo, harmony vocals
 Jeff Gilkinson – cello, bass, harmonica, porchboard, harmony vocals
 Gary Smith – double bass
 George Giddens – fiddle, mandolin, harmony vocal

Other members of the band have included:

 Dewey Martin – drums
 John Humphreys – drums
 Herb Pedersen – banjo, guitar
 Billy Ray Latham – banjo, guitar, electric guitar
 Ray Park – fiddle
 Paul York – drums
 Jeff Gilkinson – bass, cello, harmonica, banjo
 Douglas Bounsall – electric guitar, banjo, mandolin, fiddle
 Byron Berline – fiddle
 Irv Dugan – bass
 Bill Bryson – bass
 Glen D. Hardin – keyboards
 Seth Papas – drums
 Buddy Blackmon – banjo
 Rick McEwen – bass
 Ric Williams – drums
 Joe Villegas – bass
 Eddie Ponder – drums
 Pete Grant – banjo, steel guitar
 Steve Cooley – banjo, guitar, upright bass
 Wilburn Pace – banjo, fiddle
 Richard Godfrey – drums
 Shane Lail – guitar
 Jim Glaspy – banjo, guitar
 Billy Constable – guitar.

The Andy Griffith Show
Though The Dillards were already an established bluegrass band, their biggest claim to fame is performing musically as members of the fictional Darling family on The Andy Griffith Show, introducing bluegrass to many Americans who had never heard it. This was a recurring role and the Dillards were led by veteran character actor Denver Pyle as their father and jug player, Briscoe Darling. Maggie Peterson played Charlene Darling, their sister and the focus for the attentions of character Ernest T. Bass, played by Howard Morris. The appearances of the Dillards as the Darlings ran between 1963 and 1966. In 1986, the Dillards reprised the role in the reunion show Return to Mayberry. As part of their 2012 tour, Rodney Dillard answered questions about the TV series. He said the songs such as "Dooley" are about people the family knew.

On the October 1963 episode "Briscoe Declares for Aunt Bee", the Dillards performed the first wide scale airing of the 1955 Arthur "Guitar Boogie" Smith composition Feudin' Banjos (Dueling Banjos).

According to Jim Clark of The Andy Griffith Show Rerun Watchers Club, three albums have been produced with songs performed on the show. Clark says "Songs That Make Me Cry" is the only one currently available with real performances and has the three songs which included Maggie Peterson as Charlene. "Back Porch Bluegrass" and "Live Almost" include five songs that were sung on the show, and Rodney Dillard released another album with the real performances of other songs.

Pioneering influences
The Dillards are notable for being among the first bluegrass groups to have electrified their instruments in the mid-1960s.  They are considered to be pioneers of country rock and progressive bluegrass. They are known to have directly or indirectly influenced artists such as the Eagles, the Byrds, and Elton John. In 1972, The Dillards joined Elton John on his first American tour. John Paul Jones of Led Zeppelin has also acknowledged their influence, particularly in his decision to play the mandolin.

Current members
Rodney Dillard is a founding member of The Dillards – the group he formed with his brother, Douglas Dillard in the late 1950s. Credited throughout the years as the driving force behind the group's musical direction, success, and phenomenal longevity as a working act. Today, Dillard's musical duties include lead and harmony vocals, guitar, and dobro.

Beverly Cotten-Dillard is a native of Morrisville, North Carolina who performed with Janette Carter, Ola Belle Reed, Tommy Jarrell, and Doc and Merle Watson. She has appeared on Hee Haw and the Disney Channel and at Carnegie Hall. Cotten-Dillard is recognized as an authority on the traditional "clawhammer" banjo technique and is a featured member of The Dillards live shows. Her 1981 album Clog-In 'is considered an American folk classic."

George Giddens is a classically trained musician who is an awarded fiddler and mandolin player for the band.

Gary J. Smith was added to the lineup, having recorded double bass in the 2015 studio sessions for the new Dillards album. Smith is well known in Nashville circles after stints with Tom T. Hall, The Brother Boys, and Ed Snodderly.

Former member, Dean Webb, died at the age of 81, on June 30, 2018.

Discography

Albums

Compilations

Singles

References

External links
History
More info

American bluegrass music groups
Musical groups from Missouri
American country rock groups
Elektra Records artists
Progressive bluegrass music groups